Durham College of Applied Arts and Technology is located in the Durham Region of Ontario, Canada, with a campus co-located with Ontario Tech University in Oshawa, a second campus in Whitby, and community employment services in Uxbridge, Port Hope, Port Perry, Beaverton, Oshawa and Bowmanville.

History

Founded in 1967, Durham College has more than 95,000 alumni.

The college was opened on September 18, 1967, with 16 portable classrooms, 14 staff and 205 students, offering courses in applied arts, business and technology. The college soon added courses in health sciences and adult training and grew to 1,250 students by its 10th anniversary.

In the 1980s, the college grew, with enrolment increasing to 2,700 in 1987 and further expansion of the facilities, including the construction of a new robotics lab, the precursor to the Integrated Manufacturing Centre found on campus today.

In the early 1990s, the Whitby campus was established, featuring the Skills Training Centre, where thousands of apprentices have studied.

The college established partnerships with York and Trent universities, that first brought university courses to the Durham College Oshawa campus, and then with Ontario Tech University which opened in 2003. Durham and Ontario Tech have established a post-secondary partnership, sharing a campus, some facilities and selected services

In 2018, Durham College completed construction on a new building called CFCE (Centre For Collabrative Education), it houses a few classrooms for health programs, it is elevator accessible and has a secret stairs inside the building. The Simcoe Building was deleted and replaced with the CFCE building.

In October 2022 it was announced that the college had acquired naming rights to the Oshawa GO Station, located 30 minutes away from the college's main campus by bus (8.2 km). The rights were purchased for an undisclosed amount.

Student life 
On campus, there are many amenities available to students, including housing options, sports and recreational activities, shopping, transportation, parking, health and medical facilities, campus safety, and franchise of food options.

Within the college there are multiple learning spaces designated for educational purposes. One space is the  campus library which has four floors of learning space and a rotunda housing a periodicals collection. The rotunda includes a three-storey glass wall overlooking the Polonsky Commons. Other learning spaces include the computer learning commons, student services building, student centre, and bookable study spaces campus-wide.

Durham College offers first year information, academic support resources, career services, and Student Academic Learning Services (SALS). The student life office and Student Association (SA) offer events and programs for students of all years, while the student media comprises The Chronicle student newspaper, Riot Radio, and The Water Buffalo. Athletics range from badminton to basketball, rowing to running, and more.

Partnerships
Durham College has a shared campus and facilities with Ontario Tech University. The college, in conjunction with Ontario Tech and private enterprise, has developed network infrastructure to support laptop-based learning at both institutions. This includes the integration of wireless services on campus, as well as e-learning content and curriculum development.

Programs
The college offers a wide range of programs in a number of different disciplines including business, information technology, media, art, design, general arts, science, skilled trades, justice, emergency services, health and engineering technology.

Campuses and locations

Durham College has two main campuses, located in Oshawa and Whitby, Ontario.

Presidents 
 Dr. Gordon Willey (1967-1980)
 Mel Garland (1980-1988)
 Gary Polonsky (1988-2006)
 Leah Myers (2006-2008)
 Don Lovisa (2009–present)

Notable alumni

 Sherwood Bassin - College professor, general manager in Ontario Hockey League
 Jeffrey S. Boyce (General Business - Marketing, 1980) - President and CEO of Sure Energy Inc. and recipient of the Premier's Award in 2006; and
 Tyler Boyco (Digital Video Production, 2014) - filmmaker and artist popular for making a Robin Williams portrait that went viral in 2014.
 Dylan Jón Hannesson (Marketing, 2011) - CEO of the German imageboard "Krautchan.net"
 Brandon Nolan (Business Administration - Marketing 2013), retired hockey player, vice-president of Ted Nolan Foundation and advisor for community and client relations with Ishkonigan Incorporated
 Patricia O'Connor (Nursing, 1976) - Founding member of the Canadian Association of Aero-medical Transport, recipient of the Order of Canada in 2007 and recipient of the Premier's Award in 2009.
 Paul Vessey (Marketing, 1975) - COO of Visa USA and recipient of the Premier's Award in 2000;
 Fred Upshaw (Registered Nursing, 1975) Upshaw has served as president of OPSEU, which represents 110,000 Ontario public sector workers.
 Jeffrey S. Boyce (Business Administration – Marketing, 1980) Boyce is also the former president and CEO of Vermilion Resources, a $1-billion oil and gas exploration and production company that he co-founded. 
 Bev Woods (Dental Hygiene, 1986) Bev held a council position with the College of Dental Hygienists of Ontario and was president of the Bay of Quinte Dental Hygienists Society and Ontario Dental Hygienists' Association. 
 Roland Kielbasiewicz (Business Operations Management, 1990) Founder and CEO of Loraxian, Inc. The company specializes in the development, finance, ownership, and management of sustainable infrastructure projects in Canada and internationally.
 Sheldon McIntosh - Drag Queen "Tynomi Banks", who starred on the first season of Canada's Drag Race.

Sports teams

The school's team name is the Durham Lords.

Varsity sports at Durham:

 Men's and women's golf
 Men's and Women's 7's Rugby 
 Men's baseball
 Women's fastball 
 Men's and women's volleyball
 Men's and women's basketball
 Men's and women's indoor soccer

See also
 Higher education in Ontario
 List of colleges in Ontario
 Training and development
 Ontario Tech University

References

External links

  
 Official athletics website

Colleges in Ontario
Educational institutions established in 1967
Education in Oshawa
1967 establishments in Ontario